Joseph Huber may refer to:

 Joseph Huber (economist) (born 1948), chair of economic and environmental sociology at Martin Luther University of Halle-Wittenberg
 Joseph Huber (gymnast) (1893–1976), French Olympic gymnast
 Joseph J. Huber (1893–?), member of the Wisconsin State Assembly
 Joseph Huber Sr. (died 1867), president of the Los Angeles Common Council